Bazamjerd is a village in Dashtabi-ye Sharqi Rural District, Dashtabi District, Buin Zahra County, Qazvin Province, Iran. At the 2006 census, its population was 32, in 6 families.

References 

Populated places in Buin Zahra County